Letter to a Child Never Born (1975) is a novel by Italian author and journalist Oriana Fallaci. It is written as a letter by a young professional woman (presumably Fallaci herself) to the fetus she carries in utero; it details the woman's struggle to choose between a career she loves and an unexpected pregnancy, explaining how life works with examples of her childhood, and warning him/her about the unfairness of the world. The English translation was first published in 1976.

The book sold four million copies worldwide.

References

1975 novels
20th-century Italian novels
Works by Oriana Fallaci